Cover to Cover is the fourth album by the Jeff Healey Band. It is an album of cover songs, released in 1995.

Track listing

Production
Produced by Thom Panunzio and The Jeff Healey Band
Mixed by Thom Panunzio except "Freedom" mixed by Thom Panunzio and Tom Stephen
Engineered by Richard Chycki
Additional Engineering by Keith Ohman, Chad Munsey, Ronnie Rivera, Glen Marchese, Ed Krautner
Mastered by Greg Calbi

Personnel 
The Jeff Healey Band
Jeff Healey ‑ lead vocals, guitar
Joe Rockman ‑ bass guitar, backing vocals
Tom Stephen ‑ drums, backing vocals

Additional Musicians
John Popper ‑ harmonica on "Communication Breakdown"
Paul Shaffer ‑ keyboards on "Stop Breakin' Down", "Angel", "Run through the Jungle", "Badge"
Roy Bittan ‑ keyboards on "I Got a Line on You", "As the Years Go Passing By", "I'm Ready"
Amanda Marshall and Mischke Butler ‑ backing vocals on "Angel"
Stevie Vain ‑ backing vocals on "Angel", "Run Through the Jungle"
Mark Lennon, Michael Lennon and Kipp Lennon ‑ backing vocals on "I Got a Line on You"
Pat Rush ‑ additional guitar on "Shapes of Things", "Stop Breakin' Down", "Evil", "Stuck in the Middle with You", "Run Through the Jungle", "I'm Ready", "Communication Breakdown"
Jerome Godboo ‑ harp on "Evil", "I Got a Line on You"
Art Avalos ‑ percussion on "Angel", "I Got a Line on You", "Run Through the Jungle"
Denis Keldi  ‑ keyboards on "Stuck in the Middle with You"
Rick Lazar ‑ percussion on "I Got a Line on You"

Chart Positions

Album

Singles

References 

The Jeff Healey Band albums
1995 albums
Albums produced by Thom Panunzio
Arista Records albums
Covers albums